Mirko Soltau (born 13 January 1980) is a German former footballer who played as a midfielder. He played nine matches for Dynamo Dresden in the 3. Liga, the third tier of German professional football, and had a lengthy career in the lower leagues.

References

External links 
 

1980 births
Living people
Footballers from Dresden
German footballers
Association football midfielders
3. Liga players
FC Augsburg players
1. FC Union Berlin players
FC Sachsen Leipzig players
Dynamo Dresden players
Dynamo Dresden II players